Gee is the first extended play by South Korean girl group Girls' Generation. It was released on January 7, 2009, by S.M. Entertainment.

Single
A week after its release, "Gee" went #1 on Music Bank; however, questions were raised when the group did not appear on the program  for unknown reasons, with rumors spreading regarding a possible rift between SM Entertainment and KBS.  "Gee" also went to #1 on SBS's Inkigayo a week after their return.

"Gee" first tied with "Nobody" by the Wonder Girls for the longest-running #1 on music portal M.Net (6 weeks).  The song then broke the record by staying on top a seventh week, and remained in the position for an eighth week.  It also tied then broke the record for longest-running #1 on KBS's Music Bank, beating the 7-week record previously set by Jewelry in 2008 with "One More Time".  "Gee" achieved its ninth #1 on the show on March 13, 2009 and received its 10th #1 win on June 26, 2009.

The track also showed strength on other charts, topping the Mujikon, Melon and Mnet charts for eight consecutive weeks, the Dosirak chart for seven weeks, the Muse chart for six weeks, and the Baksu chart for four weeks. "Gee" topped Cyworld's hourly music chart on the release day. The song also went number one on all major digital music charts within two days. "Gee" was also ranked as the number one song of the decade by one of Korea's most popular online music websites, MelOn.

Commercial performance
SM Entertainment stated that over 100,000 copies of the mini-album were shipped to stores while sales analyst company Hanteo reported sales in excess of 30,000 copies within the first 10 days of its release. According to their agency SM Entertainment, the album sold nearly 65,000 copies. Gee was able to sell more than 100,000 copies.

Track listing
Credits adapted from Naver

Personnel
 Girls' Generation – main and backing vocals
 Lee Soo Man – producer

Release history

References

External links
 
 Gee at ManiaDB 

Dance-pop EPs
Girls' Generation albums
SM Entertainment EPs
Korean-language EPs
2009 debut EPs